Margaret Kingsley may refer to:

Maggie Kingsley
Margaret Kingsleigh, character in Alice in Wonderland